Kreuzburg and Kreutzburg are German place names meaning "cross castle" and may refer to:

 Kreuzburg, a village in the municipality of Groß Pankow (Prignitz), Germany
 Kreuzburg, the German name for a town in the former East Prussia, today Slavskoye, Russia
 Kreuzburg an der Bistritz, the German name for Piatra Neamț, Romania
 Kreuzburg O.S., the German name for Kluczbork, Poland
 Kreutzburg, the medieval name for the northern section of Jēkabpils, Latvia

See also 
 Creuzburg (disambiguation)
 Kreutzberg (disambiguation)
 Kreuzberg (disambiguation)